The capture of Erivan took place on 1 October 1827, during the Russo-Persian War of 1826–28. The city fell to the Russians after being besieged for a week and opened up the path for the eventual capture of Tabriz, the second largest city in Iran and an important trading post.

Background

Siege of Yerevan

When word reached Paskevich he abandoned any plans to move south and returned to Echmiadzin (5 September). Moving east he captured the fort of Serdar-Abad from the Persians and on 23 September appeared before the walls of Yerevan. Much of the siege work was directed by Pushchin [ru], a former engineer officer who had been reduced to the ranks for involvement with the Decembrists. When the place fell he was promoted to non-commissioned officer. Yerevan fell on 14 October. 4000 prisoners and 49 guns were taken and the Yerevan Khanate became a Russian province.

Aftermath
As a result of the capture of Tabriz, the Shah Fath-Ali Shah Qajar sued for peace which resulted in the signing of the Treaty of Turkmenchay in 1828. Under the treaty, the Erivan Khanate (present-day Armenia) and Nakhichevan Khanate (present-day Azerbaijan) were ceded to the Russian Empire.

References

Sources
 

History of Yerevan
Conflicts in 1827
1827 in the Russian Empire
1827 in Iran
Erivan
October 1827 events